The Grammy Award for Best Pop/Contemporary Gospel Album was awarded from 1991 to 2011.  From 1991 to 1993 it was awarded as Best Pop Gospel Album. According to the category description guide for the 52nd Grammy Awards, the award is reserved "For albums containing at least 51% playing time of newly recorded pop/contemporary gospel vocal tracks."

The award was discontinued in 2012 in a major overhaul of Grammy categories. From 2012, recordings in this category were shifted to the newly formed Best Contemporary Christian Music Album category.

Years reflect the year in which the Grammy Awards were presented, for works released in the previous year.

Recipients
Years reflect the year in which the Grammy Awards were presented, for works released in the previous year.

 Each year is linked to the article about the Grammy Awards held that year.

See also
 Grammy Award for Best Contemporary Christian Music Album
 Grammy Award for Best Rock Gospel Album
 List of Grammy Award categories

References

General
 

Specific

External links
Official site of the Grammy Awards

 
Grammy Awards for gospel music
Pop Contemporary Gospel Album
Pop Contemporary Gospel
Album awards